The 2015 season was AIK's 124th in existence, their 87th season in Allsvenskan, and their 10th consecutive season in the league. The team competed in Allsvenskan, UEFA Europa League, and Svenska Cupen.

Season events
Prior to the start of the season, AIK announced the signings Haukur Hauksson to a five-year contract, Fredrik Brustad and Johan Blomberg to a three-year contracts and that Mohamed Bangura would return on a two-year contract from İstanbul Başakşehir. 

On 23 December 2014, AIK announced the signing of free-agent Dickson Etuhu to a two-year contract after he had left left Blackburn Rovers during the summer of 2014, and that Ibrahim Moro had been sold to Kairat effective 1 January.

On 14 January, Celso Borges left AIK to join Deportivo La Coruña on loan until the summer of 2015, with an option to make the move permanent.

On 3 February, AIK announced the signing of Patrick Kpozo from International Allies from 15 July, when he turned 18-years old.

On 6 February, Ebenezer Ofori signed a 12-month extension to his contract, keeping him at AIK until the end of the 2017 season.

On 24 February, AIK announced the loan signing of Alex Pereira from AFC United until the summer transfer window.

On 10 July, AIK announced the signing of Jos Hooiveld and Stefan Ishizaki on contracts until the end of 2017.

On 30 July, AIK extended their loan agreement for Alex Pereira until the end of the season.

On 2 September, Sauli Väisänen joined HIFK on loan for the remainder of the season.

Squad

Transfers

In

Loans in

Out

Loans out

Released

Friendlies

Competitions

Overview

Allsvenskan

League table

Results summary

Results by round

Results

Svenska Cupen

2014–15

Group stage

2015–16

UEFA Europa League

Qualifying rounds

Squad statistics

Appearances and goals

|-
|colspan="16"|Players away on loan:

|-
|colspan="16"|Players who appeared for AIK but left during the season:

|}

Goal scorers

Clean sheets

Disciplinary record

References

AIK Fotboll seasons
AIK Fotboll season